Schinia indiana, or the phlox moth, is a moth of the family Noctuidae. It is found in the Mid-Western United States.

The wingspan is about 17–21 mm.

The larvae feed on Phlox pilosa.

References

Schinia
Moths of North America
Moths described in 1908